Andronikos Kallistos was a teacher of Greek literature in Bologna, Rome, Florence, Paris and London. He was one of the most able Greek scholars of the 15th century and cousin of the distinguished scholar Theodorus Gaza.

He was born in Thessaloniki in 1400. He lived and studied in Constantinople. After the fall of Constantinople in 1453, Kallistos went to Italy where he joined Basilios Bessarion. He taught in Bologna (1464), Rome (1469), Florence, Paris and London (1476). He began the systematic teaching of Greek literature in France. He communicated the principles of Aristotelian thought to many of his students, whose learning won them distinction in Europe. He possessed a large collection of Greek manuscripts. He traveled extensively in northern Europe and ca. 1476 in London, England he would die.

Life 
Born in Thessalonica he worked as a professor in Rome, Bologna, Florence and Paris. Among his works is a defence of Theodore of Gaza's positions against the criticisms of  Michael Apostolius (Andronicus Callistus Defensio Theodori Gazae adversus Michaelem Apostolium).

References

Bibliography 
 G. Cammelli, 'Andronico Callisto', La Rinascita, 5 (1942), 104-21, 174-214
 Jonathan Harris, Greek Émigrés in the West, 1400-1520 (Camberley: Porphyrogenitus, 1995). 
 John Monfasani, ‘A philosophical text of Andronicus Callistus misattributed to Nicholas Secundinus’, Renaissance Studies in Honour of Craig Hugh Smyth (Florence, 1985), pp. 395-406, reprinted in John Monfasani, Byzantine Scholars in Renaissance Italy: Cardinal Bessarion and other Emigres (Aldershot, 1995), no. XIII
 J. E. Powell, ‘Two letters of Andronicus Callistus to Demetrius Chalcondyles’, Byzantinisch-Neugriechische Jahrbücher 15 (1938), 14-20

External links 
List of Great Macedonians (15th-19th century)

See also
Byzantine scholars in Renaissance
List of Macedonians (Greek)
Greek scholars in the Renaissance

1400 births
1486 deaths
Greek educational theorists
Greek Renaissance humanists
Thessalonian Renaissance humanists
15th-century Greek people
15th-century Greek writers
15th-century Greek educators